Celtis toka is a medium-sized tree that commonly occurs adjacent to streams and rivers in the Sudanian-Sahel savannah climates of Tropical Africa but it can survive in drier habitats; it is also found of Yemen and Saudi Arabia.

Description 
Leaves are simple in arrangement with a coriaceous and scabrid surface, the stipules is 4–5 mm long and it is pubescent; the leaf-blade is broadly ovate in outline, about 5–7 cm long and 2–4 cm wide, the apex is acuminate to rounded and the base is cordate, the petiole is 4–6 mm long; margin entire, the stomata is unequalled cell type, meaning it is anisocytic. Yellow-green flowers  are in axillary cymes. The fruits is a globular drupe, 8–11 mm long with an endocarp that is greyish in color and ovoid in shape

Distribution 
Occurs in savannah regions, from Senegal to Sudan in Africa and also occurs in Yemen.

References 

Flora of East Tropical Africa
Flora of West Tropical Africa
toka